Osaka Amenity Park Tower is one of the largest plaza and office developments in Japan, located at the Tenmabashi District in Kita Ward, Osaka.

It was built by Mitsubishi Estates in 1994. It displays a collected line of cafes, restaurants, plazas, stores, offices and sky-view features like sky restaurants. It has a position in the List of tallest structures in Japan. It has a height of 176 meters and has 39 floors. OAP Tower is also integrated with the two OAP Residence Towers and the Teikoku Hotel.

See also
List of tallest buildings in Osaka
List of tallest structures in Japan

References

Skyscrapers in Osaka
Mitsubishi Estate
Skyscraper office buildings in Japan
Retail buildings in Japan